Ryan Blake may refer to:

Ryan Blake (footballer) (born 1991), Northern Ireland association footballer
Ryan Blake (tennis) (born 1966), American NBA scout and former tennis player